Passion Portrait (lit. Portrait of the Days of Youth) is a 1991 South Korean film directed by Kwak Ji-kyoon. It was chosen as Best Film at the Grand Bell Awards.

Plot
Melodrama about a university student's experiences with love and political ideologies.

Cast
Jung Bo-seok
Lee Hye-sook
Bae Jong-ok 
Ok So-ri 
Jeon In-taek 
Lee Hee-do 
Cho Jae-hyun 
Yu Yeong 
O Seung-myeong 
Kook Jong-hwan

Bibliography

References

Best Picture Grand Bell Award winners
1990s Korean-language films
South Korean drama films
Films directed by Kwak Ji-kyoon